Meeker is an unincorporated community in Tyler County, West Virginia, United States. Its post office  is closed.

Meeker Wilford Watters, an early postmaster, gave the town his name.

References 

Unincorporated communities in West Virginia
Unincorporated communities in Tyler County, West Virginia